The Ukrainian Men's Handball Super League is the top men's league of Ukrainian handball. It was founded in 1992. It is run by the Handball Federation of Ukraine (FHU).

History
Before, the Ukrainian teams played in the championship of the USSR. During the seasons from 1991–92 till 1999–2000, it was called the Premier League. During the seasons from 2000–01 till 2003–04, it was called the Premier League A. 

Between leagues at the end of each season, the teams exchanged – the worst drop in the lower-ranking division, their places are taken by the best team of the lower leagues. The best teams of the Super League to play in European Cup tournaments held under the auspices of the European Handball Federation (EHF).

Teams 

The following 8 clubs have competed in the Super League.

Super League past champions

 1992 : SKA Kyiv
 1993 : HC ZTR Zaporizhzhia
 1994 : CSKA-ZSU Kyiv (2)
 1995 : ZTR Zaporizhzhia (2)
 1996 : Shakhtar-Academiya
 1997 : Shakhtar-Academiya (2)
 1998 : HC ZTR Zaporizhzhia (3)
 1999 : HC ZTR Zaporizhzhia (4)
 2000 : HC ZTR Zaporizhzhia (5)
 2001 : HC ZTR Zaporizhzhia (6)

 2002 : Shakhtar-Academiya (3)
 2003 : HC ZTR Zaporizhzhia (7)
 2004 : HC ZTR Zaporizhzhia (8)
 2005 : HC ZTR Zaporizhzhia (9)
 2006 : Portovyk Yuzhne
 2007 : HC ZTR Zaporizhzhia (10)
 2008 : HC ZTR Zaporizhzhia (11)
 2009 : HC ZTR Zaporizhzhia (12)
 2010 : HC ZTR Zaporizhzhia (13)
 2011 : HC ZTR Zaporizhzhia (14)

 2012 : Dynamo Poltava
 2013 : HC Motor Zaporizhzhia
 2014 : HC Motor Zaporizhzhia (2)
 2015 : HC Motor Zaporizhzhia (3)
 2016 : HC Motor Zaporizhzhia (4)
 2017 : HC Motor Zaporizhzhia (5)
 2018 : HC Motor Zaporizhzhia (6)
 2019 : HC Motor Zaporizhzhia (7)
 2020 : HC Motor Zaporizhzhia (8)
 2021 : HC Motor Zaporizhzhia (9)
 2022 : HC Motor Zaporizhzhia (10)

See also 
 Ukrainian Women's Handball Super League
 CSK ZSU Kyiv

External links 
 Official website of the FHU
 Handball in Ukraine

Handball competitions in Ukraine
Handball leagues in Europe
Handball
Handball
Professional sports leagues in Ukraine